The following is a list of notable African-American women who have made contributions to the fields of science, technology, engineering, and mathematics. 

An excerpt from a 1998 issue of Black Issues in Higher Education by Juliane Malveaux reads: "There are other reasons to be concerned about the paucity of African American women in science, especially as scientific occupations are among the most pivotal and highly compensated in the occupational spectrum. Yet, both leaks in the pipeline and gender stereotyping contribute to the under-representation of African American women in the sciences.

Organizations like Dr. Shirley McBay's Quality Education for Minorities (QEM) have done significant work in creating a climate that encourages success in math, science, and engineering for minority students. Yet, efforts like this struggle for funding in an atmosphere that is hostile to affirmative action and to targeted educational opportunities. The evidence to support targeting, though, is in the gaps revealed by the data. Too many gaps reflect the relative absence of sisters in science.

Yet, women like Jemison, Jackson, and McBay offer stellar and motivational examples of what can be done in science careers. These sisters in science are true pioneers, women who make it possible for so many others to see work in science as an option for African American women."

B

C

D

E

F

G

H

I

J

K

L

M

N

O

P

Q

R

S

T

V

W

Y

See also 
List of Women in Technology International Hall of Fame inductees
STEM pipeline
National Society of Black Engineers
African American women in computer science
List of African-American women in medicine

Further reading

References 

Lists of African-American people
Lists of women in STEM fields
Lists of American women
African-American women